Fida Hussain Khan Gadi was a Seraiki intellectual from Seraikistan region of Punjab province of Pakistan. Fida Hussain Khan Gadi was proponent of Seraiki language and a proponent for Seraiki province of Seraikistan.

External links
 Death anniversary of Ustad Fida Hussain Gadi

References

Year of birth missing
1993 deaths
People from Multan
Punjabi people